"Late Night Feelings" is a song by English producer Mark Ronson featuring vocals from Swedish singer Lykke Li. Released on 12 April 2019, it is the title track and second single from his fifth studio album of the same name.

Music
The Guardian said the song "pulls off the old disco trick of sounding simultaneously euphoric and yearning".

Track listing
 Digital single'
 "Late Night Feelings" (featuring Lykke Li) – 4:11

 Krystal Klear Remix'
 "Late Night Feelings" (featuring Lykke Li) – 4:14

 Jax Jones Midnight Snack Remix'
 "Late Night Feelings" (featuring Lykke Li) – 3:48

 Channel Tres Remix'
 "Late Night Feelings" (featuring Lykke Li) – 4:19

Charts

Certifications

Release history

References

2019 singles
2019 songs
Mark Ronson songs
Lykke Li songs
Songs written by Mark Ronson
Song recordings produced by Mark Ronson
Songs written by Lykke Li
Songs written by Ilsey Juber
Songs written by Stephen Kozmeniuk